The Town Ground in Peterborough, England, is a cricket ground which was used by Northamptonshire County Cricket Club in First-class matches for 60 years between 1906 and 1966. It is now used predominantly for Northamptonshire Premier League games, serving as the home ground of Peterborough Town CC.

Records
 Lowest team total: 82 by Northamptonshire vs Gloucestershire, 1946
 Highest individual score: 232* by JG Langridge for Sussex against Northamptonshire, 1934
 Highest partnership: 361 by V Broderick and N Oldfield for the first wicket in Northamptonshires innings against Scotland, 1953
 Northamptonshire declared upon the dismissal of V Broderick.
 Best bowling in an innings: 8-26 by RW Clarke for Northamptonshire against Hampshire, 1951
 Best Bowling in a match: 14-211 by AF Wensley for Sussex against Northamptonshire, 1929

References

Cricket grounds in Cambridgeshire
Sports venues completed in 1906
1906 establishments in England